Pavel Anatolyevich Sviridenko (born 20 January 1985) is a former Russian professional football player.

Club career
He played two seasons in the Russian Football National League for FC Metallurg Krasnoyarsk and FC Fakel Voronezh.

External links
 
 

1985 births
Sportspeople from Volgograd
Living people
Russian footballers
Association football defenders
FC Rotor Volgograd players
FC Yenisey Krasnoyarsk players
FC Krasnodar players
FC SKA Rostov-on-Don players
FC Gomel players
FC Fakel Voronezh players
Belarusian Premier League players
Russian expatriate footballers
Expatriate footballers in Belarus